In enzymology, a glutamine-pyruvate transaminase is an enzyme that catalyzes the chemical reaction

L-glutamine + pyruvate  2-oxoglutaramate + L-alanine

Thus, the two substrates of this enzyme are L-glutamine and pyruvate, whereas its two products are 2-oxoglutaramate and L-alanine.

This enzyme belongs to the family of transferases, specifically the transaminases, which transfer nitrogenous groups.  The systematic name of this enzyme class is L-glutamine:pyruvate aminotransferase. Other names in common use include glutaminase II, L-glutamine transaminase L, and glutamine-oxo-acid transaminase.  This enzyme participates in glutamate metabolism.  It employs one cofactor, pyridoxal phosphate.

Structural studies

References

 
 

EC 2.6.1
Pyridoxal phosphate enzymes
Enzymes of known structure